is a Japanese professional shogi player ranked 4-dan.

Early life
Yamamoto was born in Kōtō, Tokyo on August 13, 1996. He learned how to play shogi from his father when he was a first-grade elementary school student, and began playing at shogi clubs, etc. to improve. When he was elementary school fourth-grade student, Yamamoto began studying under shogi professional Hisashi Ogura, who also lived in Kōtō, and as an eleven-year old in March 2008, he was accepted into the Japan Shogi Association (JSA) apprentice school at the rank of 6-kyū with Ogura as his sponsor.

Yamamoto was promoted to apprentice professional 3-dan in October 2015, and obtained full professional status and the rank of 4-dan on October 1, 2018, after finishing second the 63rd 3-dan League (AprilSeptember 2018) with a record of 13 wins and 5 losses.

Promotion history
Yamamoto's promotion history is as follows.
 6-kyū: March 2008
 3-dan: October 2015
 4-dan: October 1, 2018

References

External links
 ShogiHub: Professional Player Info · Yamamoto, Hiroshi
 

Japanese shogi players
Living people
Professional shogi players
Professional shogi players from Tokyo
People from Kōtō
1996 births